Oleksandr Volodymyrovych Lavrynovych (born June 28, 1956 in Ovruch) is a Ukrainian physicist, lawyer, politician, former member of the Supreme Council of Justice of Ukraine, a former Ukrainian member of parliament and former Minister of Justice of Ukraine. He is a Merited Jurist of Ukraine (2003). 
He was one of the founders of the first democratic party in Ukraine in 1989 – People's Movement of Ukraine and considered to be one of the "fathers" of the independence of Ukraine from the Soviet Union.

Biography
After graduating from the Shevchenko National University in 1978, Lavrynovych worked in the NAN Ukrainian SSR. In 1981–1984 he served in military (chief of radar station). From 1989 till 1998 Lavrynovych was one of the leaders of People's Movement of Ukraine. From 1990 till 1994 he was a member of the Central Election Commission of Ukraine and its First Deputy Chairman in 1991–1994.

From 1998 till 2001 he was a People's Deputy of Ukraine for People's Movement of Ukraine parliamentary faction, surrendering his deputy mandate early. In 2002 Lavrynovych was elected to parliament on the Our Ukraine party list, but refused to be registered. In May 2002 Lavrynovych was appointed as Justice Minister in the Kinakh Government. In the First Yanukovych Government (2002–2005) he was also Minister of Justice of Ukraine. After a short intermezzo as Deputy Chairman of the Board of  "Ukrnafta" (2005–2006) Lavrynovych returned to national politics in August 2006 as First Deputy Minister of the Cabinet of Ministers of Ukraine in the Second Yanukovych Government. But he soon moved to the post Minister of Justice of Ukraine again (from 1 November 2006 till 18 December 2007). In the 2007 parliamentary election he was elected Deputy of Ukraine for Party of Regions. From the dismissal of Arseniy Yatsenyuk till the election of Volodymyr Lytvyn as Chairman of the Verkhovna Rada, Oleksandr Lavrynovych assumed the position as acting chairman from November 12, 2008 till December 9, 2008. The Verkhovna Rada refused to include in its agenda an issue concerning dismissal of its first Vice Speaker Lavrynovych on November 17, 2009. Starting 11 March 2010 Lavrynovych became Justice Minister again. On 2 July he was elected as member of the Supreme Council of Justice of Ukraine. Olena Lukash replaced Lavrynovych as Justice Minister 2 days later.
On April 10, 2014 Oleksandr Lavrynovych resigned from his position with Supreme Council of Justice. Since that time he is acting as legal expert and holds the position with the Board of Institute for Legal Society, Non-governmental organization.

On 13 July 2015 the Ukrainian Prosecutor General's Office announced that Lavrynovych was suspected of embezzling public funds worth more than 8.5 million Hryvnia. It said these funds were used to finance foreign  law firm Skadden, Arps, Slate, Meagher & Flom (USA) that helped to win the court case in the European Court of Human Rights by the State of Ukraine and at the same time "to conceal evidence of criminal violations of the law by Ukrainian state law enforcement agencies and the courts" during the 2011 trial of Yulia Tymoshenko.

In March 2016 Ukrainian court released Mr. Lavrynovych from any restrictions of Prosecutor's office.

Awards
 Order of Prince Yaroslav the Wise (5th degree)
 Order of Merit (2nd degree)
 Order of Merit (3rd degree), for active participation in organizing and conducting the 1991 Ukrainian independence referendum

References

External links
Website of a law firm headed by Lavrynovych son "Lavrynovych and Partners"

 	 
 	 

 

1956 births
Living people
People from Ovruch
21st-century Ukrainian lawyers
Deputy chairmen of the Verkhovna Rada
Party of Regions politicians
Independent politicians in Ukraine
People's Movement of Ukraine politicians
Justice ministers of Ukraine
Taras Shevchenko National University of Kyiv alumni
Kyiv Polytechnic Institute alumni
Yaroslav Mudryi National Law University alumni
Koretsky Institute of State and Law alumni
Ukrainian physicists
Academic staff of Kyiv Polytechnic Institute
Second convocation members of the Verkhovna Rada
Third convocation members of the Verkhovna Rada
Sixth convocation members of the Verkhovna Rada
Seventh convocation members of the Verkhovna Rada
Recipients of the Order of Prince Yaroslav the Wise, 5th class
Recipients of the Order of Merit (Ukraine), 3rd class
Recipients of the Order of Merit (Ukraine), 2nd class
Recipients of the Order of Merit (Ukraine), 1st class
Recipients of the Honorary Diploma of the Cabinet of Ministers of Ukraine